Nyctemera kinibalina is a moth of the family Erebidae first described by Snellen in 1899. It is found on Borneo.

References

Nyctemerina
Moths described in 1899